Onjeurlina Leiataua (born 1 December 1995) is a New Zealand rugby league footballer who played for the New Zealand Warriors in the NRL Women's Premiership. Primarily a er, she is a New Zealand representative.

Playing career
Leiataua played for the Auckland Rugby Union team from 2012 to 2017 before switching to rugby league in 2018.

Leiataua was only 17 when she made her only appearance for the Black Ferns on 20 July 2013 against England at Pukekohe.

In 2018, while playing for the Otahuhu Leopards, she represented Counties Manukau at the NZRL National Women's Competition. On 1 August 2018, Leiataua joined the New Zealand Warriors NRL Women's Premiership side. In Round 1 of the 2018 NRL Women's season, she made her debut for the Warriors in their 10–4 win over the Sydney Roosters.

On 13 October 2018, she made her Test debut for New Zealand, starting at second-row in their 24–26 loss to Australia. On 12 December 2018, she was named the Kiwi Ferns Rookie of the Year at the NZRL Awards.

On 19 October 2019, Leiataua was a member of New Zealand's 2019 Rugby League World Cup 9s-winning team. On 25 October 2019, she started at second-row in New Zealand's 8–28 Test loss to Australia.

References

External links
NRL profile

1995 births
Living people
New Zealand sportspeople of Samoan descent
New Zealand female rugby union players
New Zealand women's international rugby union players
New Zealand female rugby league players
New Zealand women's national rugby league team players
Rugby league second-rows
New Zealand Warriors (NRLW) players